Tyzenhaus was a noble family of the Polish–Lithuanian Commonwealth of German extraction. It was active in the Duchy of Livonia, Duchy of Courland and the northern Grand Duchy of Lithuania. Among the best-known members of the family were Gothard Jan Tyzenhaus, the Voivode of Dorpat (1634–1640), Konstanty Tyzenhaus (1786–1853), ornithologist, and Antoni Tyzenhaus (1733–1785), the manager of royal property during the reign of Stanisław August Poniatowski. Antoni built Tyzenhaus Palace in Vilnius, Lithuania. In Rokiškis, northern Lithuania, the family also built neogothic church of St. Matthias and a palace, which houses Rokiškis Regional Museum.

This family is but a branch of the medievally-originated Baltic German house of Tiesenhausen, which already in late medieval epoch, held fiefs in Livonia and Estonia.
Other branches of that family came to some prominence in Finland, in Sweden and in Russia.

External links 

Polish noble families
Lithuanian noble families
Livonian noble families